The following is a list of Ukrainians in the Kontinental Hockey League (KHL). For the 2014-15 season, Ukrainians constitute the 14th most numerous nationality within the league. During the 2009-10 KHL season, 26 Ukrainian players participated in the competition, the most to date, out of the 41 total to have played. Alexei Zhitnik, along with Anton Babchuk and Nikolay Zherdev are of a select few to have been named to the annual All Star Game.

Oleg Tverdovsky became the first Ukrainian-born player to win the Gagarin Cup, doing so with HC Salavat Yulaev in 2010. In 2013, Kostiantyn Kasianchuk became the first Ukrainian national team player to do the same; after which the Cup was brought to Kyiv in celebration. According to Sokil Kyiv general manager Vyacheslav Zavalnyuk, 13.5% of all players in the KHL have Ukrainian roots.

Players

Note: A (★) denotes a player who has participated in an All Star Game
All statistics accurate to the end of the 2012–13 KHL season

Breakdown of players by nationality

Captains
Several players have acted as captains of their respective KHL clubs, including: Alexei Zhitnik (Dynamo Moscow); Vitaly Vishnevsky (SKA); Serhiy Varlamov, Ruslan Fedotenko, (HC Donbass); and Nikolay Zherdev (Atlant)

Players of Ukrainian descent
The following is a list of KHL players who while not born in Ukraine, are of documented Ukrainian descent.

 Mikhail Anisin
 Alexander Eremenko
 Shaun Heshka
 Andrei Nikolishin

Notes
 Figure includes both Ukrainian-born and Ukrainian national players.
 Denis Denisov was born in Kharkiv, Ukrainian SSR to a military family who relocated to Tver prior to Ukraine's independence. As a result, he never was a Ukrainian citizen.
 Yuri Silnitsky and Vladislav Shalimov played in the 2012-13 season, but did not gain Ukrainian citizenship until the following year.
 Indicates a player who was born in Russia and became a naturalized Ukrainian citizen
 Vitaly Anikeyenko, Daniil Sobchenko, and Alexander Vyukhin were killed in the 2011 Lokomotiv Yaroslavl plane crash prior to the opening game of the 2011–12 KHL season.

References 

Ukrainians

Kontinental Hockey League